Pseudosphex analis is a moth of the subfamily Arctiinae. It was described by Max Gaede in 1926. It is found in Bolivia.

References

Pseudosphex
Moths described in 1926